Hebrews 4 is the fourth chapter of the Epistle to the Hebrews in the New Testament of the Christian Bible. The author is anonymous, although the internal reference to "our brother Timothy" (Hebrews 13:23) causes a traditional attribution to Paul, but this attribution has been disputed since the second century and there is no decisive evidence for the authorship. This chapter contains the admonition to press on toward 'God's Rest' and a reflection on the power of God's Word.

Text
The original text was written in Koine Greek. This chapter is divided into 16 verses.

Textual witnesses
Some early manuscripts containing the text of this chapter are:
Papyrus 46 (175–225; complete)
Papyrus 13 (225-250; complete)
Codex Vaticanus (325-350)
Codex Sinaiticus (330-360)
Codex Alexandrinus (400-440)
Codex Ephraemi Rescriptus (~450; complete)
Codex Freerianus (~450; extant verse 3–6, 12–14)
Codex Claromontanus (~550)
Codex Coislinianus (~550; extant verse 12–15)

Old Testament references
 : Psalm 
 : Psalm 
 : 
 : 
 Hebrews 4:7:

A call to faithfulness (3:7–4:13)

Verse 7
again He designates a certain day, saying in David, "Today," after such a long time, as it has been said:
"Today, if you will hear His voice,
Do not harden your hearts."
Therefore, this day ("Today") is another day in the future for God's people to enter a heavenly rest, beyond the enjoyment of life in the land of Israel.

Verse 8
For if Joshua had given them rest, then He would not afterward have spoken of another day.
The "rest" experienced by the Israelites in the time of Joshua was 'an earthly anticipation of the ultimate, heavenly rest', an old covenant promise that is fulfilled in a transformed way by Jesus Christ.

Verse 9

So there remains a Sabbath rest for the people of God.

Verse 10
Those who entered his place of rest also rest from their work as God did from his.

Verse 11
Let us try as hard as we can to enter God’s rest so that no one will fail by following the example of those who refused to obey.

Verse 12
For the word of God is living and powerful, and sharper than any two-edged sword, piercing even to the division of soul and spirit, and of joints and marrow, and is a discerner of the thoughts and intents of the heart.

Verse 13
Nothing in all creation is hidden from God. Everything is naked and exposed before his eyes, and he is the one to whom we are accountable.

The compassion of Christ (4:14–5:10)
The characteristic term of this section is 'High Priest', which links to the beginning of the previous section (3:1; cf. 2:17) as an introduction to the new segment.

Verse 15
For we do not have a High Priest who cannot sympathize with our weaknesses, but was in all points tempted as we are, yet without sin.
"Tempted as we are": referring to the temptations of Christ mentioned in Hebrews 2:18.

See also
 Angel
 High priest
 Jesus Christ
 Joshua
 Related Bible parts: Numbers 1, Psalm 95, Luke 4, Luke 22, John 10, 1 Corinthians 10, 2 Corinthians 12, Philippians 3, 2 Timothy 1, Hebrews 2, Revelation 3

References

Sources

External links
 King James Bible - Wikisource
English Translation with Parallel Latin Vulgate
Online Bible at GospelHall.org (ESV, KJV, Darby, American Standard Version, Bible in Basic English)
Multiple bible versions at Bible Gateway (NKJV, NIV, NRSV etc.)

04